The Philological Library ( is a component of the "Rust and Silver Lodges" complex in the main campus of the Freie Universität Berlin. It was designed by internationally known architect Norman Foster, Baron Foster of Thames Bank in the shape of a human brain, and opened in 2005. 
The library merges the separate smaller libraries of the departments and institutes of humanities and now contains:
General and Comparative literature
Byzantine/ Modern Greek studies
English studies
German studies
Comparative and Indo-European Linguistics
Classics
Dutch Linguistics and Literature
Indian Linguistics and Literature/ South Asian Studies
Latin American Studies
Medieval Latin Language and Literature
Philosophy (since 2007)
Romance studies
Slavic studies
It has become the centerpiece of the university's Dahlem campus and a Berlin architectural landmark.

External links

 Facts about the Philological library (German)

Foster and Partners buildings
Lattice shell structures
Buildings and structures completed in 2005
Libraries in Berlin
Free University of Berlin
Academic libraries in Germany
Libraries established in 2005